Turukhansky District is an administrative and municipal district (raion), one of the forty-three in Krasnoyarsk Krai, Russia. It is located in the west of the krai and borders with Taymyrsky Dolgano-Nenetsky District in the north, Evenkiysky District in the east, Yeniseysky District in the south, and with Tyumen Oblast in the west. Its administrative center is the rural locality (a selo) of Turukhansk. Population:  12,439 (2002 Census);  The population of Turukhansk accounts for 24.9% of the district's total population.

Geography
The following tributaries of the Yenisey flow through the district: the Podkamennaya Tunguska River, the Bakhta River, the Yeloguy River, the Nizhnyaya Tunguska River, the Turukhan River, and the Kureyka River.

History
The district was founded on June 7, 1928. The Central Siberia Nature Reserve was established in a sector of the district in 1985 as a protected area of the East Siberian taiga ecoregion. In 2013 the Museum of Taiga Traditions was established in Bakhta village.

Administrative divisions

Government
As of 2013, the Head of the district and the Chairman of the District Council is Anatoly I. Goloded.

Demographics
The district is home to most of Ket people, a small and declining ethnic group whose language is thought by some linguists to be related to the Na-Dene languages of North American Indians. Nowadays, most of people still speaking Ket live in just three localities: Kellog, Surgutikha, and Maduyka, all of which are situated in Turukhansky District.

Before the collapse of the Soviet Union, the district was predominantly made up of Lithuanians, Germans, Russians, Tatars and Poles. When the Soviet Union fell apart, many of these peoples moved back to their respective countries, turning the entire area into an almost entirely Slavic one populated by Ukrainians, Belorussians, and Russians. Aside from Slavic populations, around 10% of the district is made up of Ket people, and a few German families.

Notable people
Joseph Stalin lived in exile on the territory of the modern district before the October Revolution.
Alexander Kotusov (1955 - 2019), Ket folk singer, composer and writer of songs in the Ket language.
Vasilina Makovtseva (born 1977), film and theater actress.

References

Notes

Sources

 
Districts of Krasnoyarsk Krai
States and territories established in 1928